Derek Ashton (4 July 1922 – 16 February 1997) was an English footballer who played as a defender in the Football League for Aston Villa. He was on the books of  Wolverhampton Wanderers without appearing in league football, and played non-league football for Wellington Town.

References

1922 births
1997 deaths
Footballers from Worksop
English footballers
Association football defenders
Wolverhampton Wanderers F.C. players
Aston Villa F.C. players
Telford United F.C. players
English Football League players